Kim Yong-man is a Korean name consisting of the family name Kim and the given name Yong-man, and may also refer to:

 Kim Yong-man (writer) (born 1940), South Korean writer
 Kim Yong-man (comedian) (born 1967), South Korean comedian